Duckmanton is a village within the civil parish of Sutton cum Duckmanton, in North East Derbyshire, between Bolsover and Chesterfield.

In chronostratigraphy, the British sub-stage of the Carboniferous period, the 'Duckmantian' derives its name from the study of geological exposures in a railway cutting at Duckmanton.

History
Duckmanton is recorded in 1086 in the Domesday Book under the land of Ralph Fitzhubert.

References

See also
Adelphi Canal

Villages in Derbyshire
North East Derbyshire District